Artsakh State University is the oldest and largest university in the self-proclaimed Republic of Artsakh. Over the course of its 50-year history, Artsakh State University has produced over 20,000 graduates in 60 fields of study. Currently, the university prepares specialists in 31 areas. Instructional languages are Armenian and Russian. The university has established close ties with other educational institutions and universities in Armenia and other countries.

History 
The university was established in 1969, in Stepanakert, the centre of the Nagorno-Karabakh Autonomous Oblast.

At the time of its establishment, the university was called the Stepanakert Branch of Baku Pedagogical Institute named after Lenin and had only two Chairs: the Chair of Language and Literature and the Chair of Mathematics. Education was conducted in Armenian, Azerbaijani, and later in Russian.

In 1973, the university got an independent status and was renamed into Stepanakert State Pedagogical Institute.

In the second half of the 1980s, in the beginning days of the new stage of Artsakh Armenians’ liberating movement, the university became the scientific basing epicenter of national struggle.

As a result, classes at Stepanakert State Pedagogical Institute were temporarily suspended, and the university moved to Vanadzor Pedagogical Institute. After the Spitak earthquake of December 7, 1988, the university lecturers and students had to return to Stepanakert, as Stepanakert branch of Vanadzor Pedagogical Institute.

In October 1992, the Government of Armenia made a decision to merge the Stepanakert branch of Vanadzor Pedagogical Institute with Stepanakert branch of Yerevan Engineering University, renaming the newly established university into Artsakh State University, ASU.

During the independence of the Nagorno-Karabakh Republic the university has noted significant development. The academic year 2008-2009 of the university was marked by the launch of a new educational process - the three-level education, aimed at the three basic cycles: Bachelor, Master and Doctorate Studies - by joining the Bologna Process. The educational system is organized in full-time and part-time sections.

The campus of the university comprises three subsidiary buildings and administrative building. The university has developed 5 professional faculties with around 3 000 students. The 200-member staff of the university encompasses 16 Professors, 78 Associate Professors, 53 Senior Lecturers, 15 Assistants.

Highly qualified professionals from Artsakh, as well as from Armenia and abroad are invited to deliver lectures on contractual basis. Currently there are around 50 postgraduate students enrolled in the Doctorate Study to defend their PhD thesis and be awarded Doctor of Sciences degrees.

The educational centres operating in the university include

 the Armenological Centre
 the Ethnographic Centre
 the Centre of Friends of Russian Culture
 the Knowledge Testing Computer Centre

There are 3 up-to-date equipped computer labs, other laboratories, basic military training cabinet conforming to the latest developments in the military field, shooting hall, two gyms and two conference rooms. More than 300-seat assembly hall hosts versatile cultural activities, the smaller assembly hall - sessions of the Scientific Council, conferences and discussions.

The university library possesses 100 000 books, the electronic library with fast internet connection - around 40 000 books.

The university possesses a publishing unit that issues "Academic Bulletin", "Armenological Magazine", Artsakh State University monthly magazine, scientific-educational and other literature. The students have lectures in the university observatory.

Since its inception - for 50 years now - the university has improved the educational process. The academician A. Aghabekyan, publicist Zori Balayan, Kim Bakshi, A. Nuykin, the former Vice-Speaker of the UK Parliament Caroline Cox, the member of the Swiss Parliament, Dominik de Buman, the member of European Parliament, Francois Rosblanch, historians R. Hovhanisyan, V. Dadryan, A. Ohanjanyan, the politicians Sh. Kocharyan, V. Manasyan, the academicians S. Grigoryan, E. Ghasaryan, V. Zakaryan, the oceanologist A. Sarkissov, the linguist G. Jahoukyan, the physicist R. Martirosyan, the economist Y. Suvaryan, the engineer S. Beglaryan, the Catholicos of all Armenians, Garegin the Second, the head of the Artsakh diocese of the Armenian Apostolic Church, Archbishop Pargev Martirosyan, many other state, political figures and spiritual leaders periodically visit and deliver lectures in the university.

ASU has collaboration agreements with Yerevan State University, Yerevan State Pedagogical University after Kh. Abovyan, Public Administration Academy of the RA, Armenian State University of Economics, National Agricultural University of Armenia, State Architectural University of Armenia, Yerevan State Architectural and Engineering University, Vanadzor Pedagogical University after H. Tumanyan, Gyumri State Pedagogical University after M. Nalbandyan.

ASU has initiated contacts with Educational Academy of the Russian Federation, Vladimir State University, Saratov University. The university has established closer contacts and has signed Association Agreements with the universities of post-Soviet newly independent states - the university of Pridnestrovian Moldavian Republic, the universities of Abkhazia and South Ossetia and has set up a scientific cabinet devoted to the sister universities.

The university holds programmes in collaboration with American University of Armenia, Armenian-Russian (Slavic) University, French University of Armenia, Central European University of Slovakia, Californian State University (Fresno) and other internationally ranked universities.

A highly successful collaboration was the three-sided cooperation and implementation of educational programme with international institutions "Synopsis-Armenia" and "Karabakh Telecom" CJSC.

The ASU diplomas and certificates are recognized in the Artsakh Republic, Armenia and abroad. The university has been educating the legal, executive, juridical, military, political, pedagogical and sport leadership of Artsakh Republic.

Daily life 
The university has a green area with summer houses and walkways of ever-green trees to relax and to prepare for classes.

The university operates three canteens.

There is a 250-room dormitory at the disposal of students from remotely-located regions of Artsakh Republic and experts invited from abroad.

Visitors and official delegations to the university pay respect to the memorial dedicated to those 75 students who fell victim to the Artsakh Liberation War.

Study abroad program
In 2011, with the help of Artsakh Development Group, a non-profit organization that helps bring awareness in the United States about issues concerning Artsakh, the university launched a study abroad program. The program was launched with the California State University at Dominguez Hills to allow 12-15 students to spend a summer in Artsakh and take courses on politics, history, and economy regarding Artsakh and Armenia.

Research
The Artsakh State University consists of five departments: the Faculty of Natural Sciences, the Faculty of Philology (Linguistics), the Faculty of Pedagogy and Sports, the Faculty of History and Law, and the Faculty of Economics. The scholars and students of the Artsakh State University commonly engage in research in the areas of National Security, Politics, Agricultural Studies, and Archaeology.

In 2006, a team of international archaeologists began doing research in the village of Azokh where in the 1970s it was discovered that the place is a home to ancient settlers, including Neanderthals. Armenian scientists, including two Artsakh State University students, have been active participants throughout the research period.

Faculties 

 the Faculty of Natural Sciences
 the Philological Faculty
 the Faculty of Pedagogy and Sport
 the Faculty of History and Law
 the Faculty of Economics

University Chairs 

 the Chair of Mathematics
 the Chair of General and Applied Physics
 the Chair of Geography
 the Chair of Biology  and Chemistry
 the Chair of Applied Mathematics and Informatics
 the Chair of Romance-Germanic Languages
 the Chair of Russian Language and Literature
 the Chair of Armenian Language after academician S. Abrahamyan
 the Chair of Literature and Journalism
 the Chair of Pedagogy and Psychology
 the Chair of Physical Training and Military Training
 the Chair of Fine Arts
 the Chair of History and Political Science
 the Chair of Law
 the Chair of Finance and Accounting
 the Chair of Economic Theory and Management

Partner institutions
  University of Central Europe, Skalica, Slovakia
  Russian-Armenian (Slavonic) University, Yerevan, Armenia
  California State University, Dominguez Hills, Los Angeles County, California
  Université catholique de Louvain, Louvain-la-Neuve, Belgium

See also
 List of universities in the Republic of Artsakh

Further reading
 https://web.archive.org/web/20160304124350/http://armenhes.blogspot.com/2009/01/artsakh-president-addresses-artsakh.html
 https://web.archive.org/web/20120425132219/http://imagineneutralzone.com/2011/04/15/the-bologna-educational-system-in-nagorno-karabakh/

References

External links
 
 University's entry in the SPYUR Information System

Nagorno-Karabakh
Educational institutions established in 1992
1992 establishments in the Republic of Artsakh